Campestre do Menino Deus ("Campestral of Child God") is a bairro in the District of Sede in the municipality of Santa Maria, in the Brazilian state of Rio Grande do Sul. It is located in north Santa Maria.

Villages 
The bairro contains the following villages: Campestre do Menino Deus, Perau, Rincão do Soturno, Vila Dutra, Vila Garibaldi, Vila Menino Deus, Vila Pires.

References 

Bairros of Santa Maria, Rio Grande do Sul